Work Done on Premises is the first album and first live album released by The Radiators (US).

Overview

Three years after they were formed, The Radiators finally released their first album on their own Croaker label.  The album is a live concert recording of a performance at Tipitina's nightclub in the band's home of New Orleans on May 9, 1980.  Originally released as a double LP, the album was later re-released as a single CD.

Original vinyl track listing

CD

Credits

 Camile Baudoin — guitars and vocals
 Frank Bua — drums
 Dave Malone — guitars and vocals
 Reggie Scanlan — bass
 Ed Volker — percussion, piano, horn and vocals
 Bill Cat — producer
 The Radiators — producer

References

The Radiators (American band) albums
1980 live albums